Iruttinte Athmavu is a 1967 Indian Malayalam-language film directed by P. Bhaskaran and written by M. T. Vasudevan Nair based on his own short story of the same name. It stars Prem Nazir and Sharada in lead roles with Thikkurissy Sukumaran Nair, P. J. Antony, Ushakumari, Kozhikode Shantha Devi and Baby Rajani in supporting roles. The film is about a mentally unstable youth born into a matriarchal family who is forced to live as a mad man in chains and who is misunderstood and ill-treated by everyone except his uncle's daughter. The film features music by M. S. Baburaj, cinematography by E. N. Balakrishnan and editing by G. Venkitaraman and Das.

Prem Nazir played the mentally challenged Bhranthan Velayudhan, widely considered to be one of the finest performances of Prem Nazir's career. Nazir himself rated his role of Velayudhan in Iruttinte Athmavu and as the swashbuckling folk hero Thampan in Padayottam as his best. Also, its script is regarded as one of the finest by M. T. Vasudevan Nair.  A landmark film in Malayalam cinema, the film provided Malayalam cinema with a new direction; that of the low-budget film. The film has earned a dedicated cult following. It won the National Film Award for Best Film on Other Social Issues. It missed the Best Film and Best Actor (Prem Nazir) award only narrowly. Despite all the acclaim, the film was a box office failure.

The film was part of MT's trilogy of political melodramas – the other two being Murappennu (1965) and Asuravithu (1968), both directed by A. Vincent. Major indoor parts of the film were shot in Satya Studios in Madras and outdoor parts from the premises of Bharathapuzha at Shoranur.

Plot 
Velayudan's existence posed a problem to all the members of the joint family. Velayudhan is a twenty-one-year-old man, but he has the intelligence of a child. The head of the joint family thinks Velayudan symbolizes the curse which hangs heavy over the house. To his mother, he is the source of constant sorrow.  His uncle's daughter is his would-be bride.  He is attached to her.  She is very kind to him and refuses to treat him as a mad man. Velayudan triggers problems one after the other and every new lapse help only to put fresh chains. He refuses to feel he is mad.  In the end, Ammukutty is given away in marriage to an old widower. Velayudhan surrenders himself and yells "Chain me, I am mad!"

Cast 

 Prem Nazir as Bhranthan Velayudhan
 Thikkurissy Sukumaran Nair as Madhavan Nair (Karanavar)
 P. J. Antony as Gopalan Nair
 M. S. Nampoothiri as Muthachan (grandfather)
 T. S. Muthaiah as Rajan
 K. Balaji as Chandran
 Sankaradi as Achuthan Nair (house servant)
 Adoor Bhasi as Guru Kunhichathu
 Kaduvakulam Antony as Jyotsyan (astrologist)
 Baby Rajani as Unni
 Sharada as Ammukutty
 Ushakumari/Vennira Aadai Nirmala as Prema
 Kozhikode Shantha Devi as Parukkutty Amma (Velayudhan's mother)
 Philomina as Meenakshi Amma
 Padmini as Nani
 Shobha as Malini
 Seleena as Neeli
 Rugmini as Karthi

Soundtrack 
The music was composed by M. S. Baburaj and the lyrics were written by P. Bhaskaran. All songs in the film were sung by S. Janaki, which is a landmark.

Writing 
The film is scripted by M. T. Vasudevan Nair based on his own a short story with the same name. The screenplay is regarded as one of the finest by the noted writer. One could see a lot of the pre-occupations of the scenarist, who carried the touches of human relationships through all of his subsequent films whether as screenplay writer or director. A part of the screenplay of Iruttinte Athmavu is being taught in school classes while the complete screenplay is being taught at degree level.

Legacy 
The film is considered one of the best Malayalam films ever made, it is still critically acclaimed even 50 years after its release. The film provided Malayalam cinema with a new direction; that of the low-budget film. In spite of its large number of studio shots and overall theatricality, the film was so culturally rich that many of the episodes would become archetypes for future Malayalam film makers dealing with family drama. The film remains one of the most influential films in Malayalam film history.

References

External links 
 

1960s Malayalam-language films
Films based on short fiction
Films directed by P. Bhaskaran
Films with screenplays by M. T. Vasudevan Nair